Blooming Prairie High School is a Public school located in Blooming Prairie, Minnesota.  The high school teaches students in grades 7-12, and has a student body of approximately 350, with a student-teacher ratio of 12:1.

School system
The Blooming Prairie Public School System consists of Blooming Prairie Elementary School and Blooming Prairie High School. The school district consists of a combined student body of approximately 950, with a student-teacher ratio of 14:1. The Minnesota state average is a 16:1.

Athletics
The High School has a comprehensive, year-round, gender-balanced sports program. This includes football, volleyball, cheerleading, and cross-country in the Fall; wrestling and both boys' and girls' basketball in the Winter; and softball (for girls), baseball (for boys), boys' and girls' golf, and boys' and girls' track teams in the Spring. The Blooming Prairie football team was the 2010 conference champion. They also were State champs in 2019.

School spirit
Blooming Prairie High showed its school spirit in March 2011 when it showed support for Jordan Ressler, a junior who died in a motor vehicle accident in November 2010, by displaying the University of Texas logo in a human form and by wearing the distinctive orange clothing of the team he loved.

References

External links
 Blooming Prairie High School
 Blooming Prairie High School football

Public high schools in Minnesota
Educational institutions established in 1868
Schools in Steele County, Minnesota
Public middle schools in Minnesota
Public elementary schools in Minnesota
1868 establishments in Minnesota